Pierre Grabar (September 10, 1898, Kiev - January 26, 1986, Paris) was a French biochemist and immunologist, born in Russia. He was the founding president of the Société Française d'Immunologie.  He studied antigen-antibody reactions and developed a "carrier" theory of antibody function. His award-winning development of Immunoelectrophoresis made it possible to identify specific bodily proteins, opening new avenues in medical research.

An important figure for a generation of immunologists and biochemists, he helped to rebuild the field of French and European immunology after World War II though his teaching and research.
He welcomed many international students to his laboratory, which has been described as "extraordinarily vibrant and active" and "one of the best in the world".

In 1963 Grabar received a  Canada Gairdner International Award and in 1968 the Prix Jaffé. In 1958 he received the Emil von Behring Prize and in 1977 the Robert Koch Medal. In 1962 he became a member of the German National Academy of Sciences Leopoldina. He was an officer in the French Legion of Honor.

Childhood and studies

Pierre Grabar was born in  Kiev, Russia, on September 10, 1898.  His father was 
Nicolas (Nikolay S.) Grabar (1852-1924), a lawyer and State Counsellor at the Court of Cassation of St Petersburg. His mother was Baroness Elisabeth de Prittwitz (1866-1924), an artist. His older brother André Grabar became a prominent professor of ancient Christian and Byzantine archaeology and art.

Pierre Grabar completed high school in Kiev in 1916. 
During the Russian Revolution of 1917, Grabar's family fled the country to France. 
During the Russian Civil War Grabar was an officer in the White Army.

In 1921, Grabar went to France. He entered the École des Hautes Études Industrielles in Lille, France and obtained a chemical engineering degree in 1924. Pierre Grabar became a naturalized citizen of France as of August 8, 1929.

Grabar received a doctorate from the University of Strasbourg in 1930, after working on uremia and salt deficiency (see below).  He also earned a Doctor of Sciences degree from the Sorbonne in 1942, for his work on ultrafiltration and its applications.

Career
After working briefly in industry Grabar became chief (chef de laboratoire) of a clinical laboratory at the University of Strasbourg from 1926‑1930. There he began doing medical research on kidney function with professor Leon Blum. Grabar received his doctorate in 1930, having worked on uremia and salt deficiency and published  "Azotemie par manque de sel" (Uremia due to salt deficiency).

Grabar then developed a technique of fractionation of proteins through nitrocellulose ultrafilters of defined porosity, making it possible to specify the dimensions of proteins, toxins and viruses. This work was confirmed later by electron microscopy.

In 1937-1938 Grabar was a Rockefeller Foundation Fellow at Columbia University in New York, USA.  There he met the founder of quantitative immunology, Michael Heidelberger and found his vocation for the relatively new science of immunology.

Returning to Paris in 1938, Grabar joined the Institut Pasteur as head of the laboratory (Chef de Laboratoire) from 1938-1946.  He served as head of microbial chemistry (Chef de Service de Chimie microbienne) from 1946-1960.

During the 1950s, a time when translations of abstracts and papers often were not  available, Pierre Grabar contributed to the Annual Review of Microbiology by writing reviews of recent Russian research.

From 1960 to 1968 Grabar was director of l'Institut de recherches sur le cancer (Cancer Research Institute) of the Centre National de la Recherche Scientifique (CNRS) in Villejuif, France where he carried out research on proteins and cancer.

In 1969, Grabar returned to the Pasteur Institute, where he was named honorary chief (chef de service honoraire).

Immuno-electrophoretic analysis
In 1948, Grabar began to expand on the work of the physico-chemist Arne Tiselius, who won a Nobel Prize in chemistry for his work on the electrophoresis of macromolecules. Pierre Grabar spent several years simplifying Tiselius' methodology, modifying his method by introducing antibodies.

In 1953 Grabar developed immunoelectrophoresis, combining electrophoresis and immunochemical analysis to create an "immuno-electrophoretic method". He used a gel medium, designed by Jacques Oudin, also at the Institut Pasteur, and developed the immunoelectrophoretic analysis method with the help of American student Curtis A. Williams, Jr.

They published a brief introductory report in 1953 and a longer exposition in 1955, both in Biochimica et Biophysica Acta.
Simple and inexpensive,  immunoelectrophoresis quickly became a widely-used method of analysis in clinical biology with application in a broad range of areas. As of 1980, the 1955 paper was considered a "Citation classic" with over 680 citations.

Grabar and Williams discussed applications of the technique to the study of serum proteins in three further papers in the Journal of Immunology. These focused on immunological studies of  human serum fractions; antiserum types and the distribution of their constituent antibodies; and human γ-globulin.

Immunological phenomena

Grabar's research on immunological phenomena led him to have unorthodox views on the role of molecules. 
Grabar suggested that immune mechanisms could be viewed in terms of transporter functions, part of a normal system for handling metabolic and catabolic substances. This hypothesis was disputed by many of his contemporaries who viewed them as defensive mechanisms. Pierre Grabar fiercely defended his position for many years, confirming his theory through experiments. This idea has since become accepted.

Selected publications

Awards and honors
 1935, Inaugural recipient of the Prix Maurice Nicloux, with R. Guillemet.
 1958, Emil-von Behring Prize, Philipps University of Marburg
 1962, Member of the German National Academy of Sciences Leopoldina in the Microbiology and Immunologist category
 1963, Canada Gairdner International Award
 1968, Prix Jaffé
 1969, Member, Académie Nationale de Médecine (French National Academy of Medicine)
 1977, Robert Koch Medal
  Officier of the Ordre national de la Légion d'honneur (French Legion of Honor)

External links

References

1898 births
1986 deaths
French biochemists
French immunologists
Academic staff of the University of Strasbourg
Emigrants from the Russian Empire to France
Members of the Royal Swedish Academy of Sciences